The Chartley Castle Tournament was a Victorian era  grass court tennis event first staged in August 1882 on the grounds of Chartley Castle, Stowe-by-Chartley, Staffordshire, England. The tournament ran until 1888.

History
The Chartley Castle Tournament was an early Victorian era tennis tournament that was held between 5th to 7th August 1882, on the grounds of the ruins of Chartley Castle (f.1100). The tournament was feature as part of an industrial exhibition staged that year. The men's singles event was won by Mr. H. Carpenter. The tournament also featured a men's doubles event that was won by Mr. H. Carpenter and Mr. R.F. Blakiston. The tournament ran until 1888.

Finals

 
Incomplete Roll

Mens Singles

Mens Doubles

References

Grass court tennis tournaments
Defunct tennis tournaments in the United Kingdom